Stéphane Valeri (born 1 March 1962) is a Monegasque politician and businessman. He served as the president of the National Council, which is the most powerful elected position in Monaco, between 22 February 2018 and 23 October 2022. He is the former Minister for Social Affairs and Health in Monaco.  He served three terms as a National Councillor, and then as its president, but resigned halfway through the second term so that he could serve as a Government Minister.

While growing up Valeri attended two high schools (Lycée Albert Prime, and Lycée Masséna), as well as the European School of Management in Berlin. Valeri previously served as executive assistant for SBM's Sales-Marketing department, but transferred a year late to the Advertising-Promotions department. Following his departure from SBM, Valeri founded Monaco-based communications group PROMOCOM.  After twenty-one years as Deputy Chairman (1988–2009), Valeri resigned from his position and entered public service. Outside of politics, Valeri serves on the board of directors for the Prince Albert II of Monaco Foundation.

In 1999, Prince Rainier III awarded him with the Order of Saint-Charles. In 2012, Valeri was appointed to the French Legion of Honour. On 25 January 2013 Valeri's French country home in Peille was damaged by an arsonist. Valeri filed an official complaint the following day.

After winning the 2018 general election, Valeri once again became president of the National Council. He did not stand in the 2023 general election and was succeeded as president by Brigitte Boccone-Pagès.

References

External links

Profile of Stéphane Valeri
Legion of Honour of Stéphane Valeri
Interview with Stéphane Valeri

Living people
1962 births
Presidents of the National Council (Monaco)
Priorité Monaco politicians
Monegasque businesspeople
Commanders of the Order of Saint-Charles